Kenneth Mackay may refer to:

 Kenneth Mackay (Australian politician) (1859–1935), Australian soldier and politician
 Buddy MacKay (Kenneth Hood MacKay Jr., born 1933), American politician and diplomat 
 Kenneth Mackay, 2nd Earl of Inchcape (1887–1939), British businessman and peer
 Kenneth James William Mackay, 3rd Earl of Inchcape (1917–1994), British businessman and peer